Amedeo Felisa (born 1946) is an Italian businessman, and the chief executive (CEO) of Aston Martin since May 2022. He was CEO of Ferrari from 2008 to 2016. 

Felisa was born in Milan in 1946. He earned a degree in mechanical engineering from the Polytechnic University of Milan.

Felisa was CEO of Ferrari from 2008 to 2016 when it was a Fiat subsidiary.

In May 2022, Aston Martin announced that Tobias Moers was stepping down as CEO with immediate effect, and that Felisa would succeed him.

References

Living people
Ferrari people
1946 births
Businesspeople from Milan
Italian chief executives
Polytechnic University of Milan alumni